Labdia embrochota is a moth in the family Cosmopterigidae. It was described by Edward Meyrick in 1914. It is known from Malawi.

References

Labdia
Moths described in 1914